Chillakur mandal is one of the 34 mandals in Tirupati district in the Indian state of Andhra Pradesh. It is a part of Gudur revenue division and is headquartered at Chillakur.

History 
Chillakur mandal was a part of Nellore district until 2022. It was made part of the newly formed Tirupati district effective from 4 April 2022 by the Y. S. Jagan Mohan Reddy-led Government of Andhra Pradesh.

Demographics 

It had a sex ratio of 941, making it the mandal with lowest sex ratio in the erstwhile Nellore district. Scheduled Castes and Scheduled Tribes made up 16,806 and 8,490 of the population respectively. It had a literacy rate of 60.05% with 66.8% among males and 52.84% among females.

Administration 
Chillakur mandal is a part of Gudur revenue division. The headquarters are located at Chillakur. As of 2011 census, the mandal comprises the following 30 villages:

 Note: Ippapudi and Pallamala Khandrika were uninhabited

Economy 
In 2019, a desalination plant was proposed to be set up in the mandal to resolve drinking water issues in the erstwhile Nellore district.

Agriculture 
Rice is the major crop grown in the mandal primarily during the Rabi season. Greengram and Blackgram are also cultivated during Rabi season although sparsely. Groundnuts, fresh and dry fruits are grown widely during the Kharif season and less prominently during the Rabi season.

Industrial sector 
The mandal is proposed to be a part of the Chennai Bangalore Industrial Corridor. Kriscity, an industrial city comprising educational institutions, skill development units, research and development projects, residential, commercial, and tourism projects is proposed to be set up in the area.

Politics 
Chillakur mandal is a part of Gudur Assembly constituency and Tirupati Lok Sabha constituency. , Chillakur mandal had 36,132 eligible voters with 17,849 male voters and 18,283 female voters. Varaprasad Rao Velagapalli is representing the Gudur constituency as the Member of the Legislative Assembly (MLA) in Andhra Pradesh Legislative Assembly, and Maddila Gurumoorthy is representing the Tirupati constituency as the Member of Parliament (MP) in Lok Sabha.

References 

Mandals in Tirupati district